Ergon, Inc. is a privately owned company based in Jackson, Mississippi. The company, founded by Leslie Lampton in 1954 with two employees, refines and distributes petroleum products and serves customers in over 90 countries.

Companies and subsidiaries 
Ergon Inc. consists of companies that operate under six segments, as represented below.

Refining and marketing 
Ergon Refining, Inc. (ERI)
 Ergon International, Inc.
Ergon – West Virginia, Inc.
Process Oils, Inc.

Specialty chemicals 
Resinall Corp

Asphalt and emulsions 
Ergon Asphalt & Emulsions, Inc. (EAE, Ergon A&E)
 Ergon Asfaltos México HC, LLC (EAM)
 Blueknight Energy Partners, L.P. and Subsidiaries (BKEP) 
 ErgonArmor, a Division of Ergon Asphalt & Emulsions 
 Paragon Technical Services, Inc.
Crafco, Inc.

Midstream and logistics 
Ergon Oil Purchasing, Inc. (EOP)
Ergon Terminaling, Inc. (ETI)
Ergon Trucking, Inc.
Magnolia Marie Transport Company (MMT)
Ergon Marine & Industrial Supply, Inc.

Oil and gas 
Lampton-Love, Inc., and Subsidiaries

Construction and real estate 
Ergon Construction Group, Inc. 
 Alliant Construction
 ISO Services
Ergon Properties, Inc., and Subsidiaries

Founder
The founder, Leslie B. Lampton (1925 - 2018) graduated from Saint Stanislaus College (boys prep) and then graduated Ole Miss in 1948.

External links
 Ergon website
Ergon Refining
Ergon Asphalt & Emulsions 

Oil companies of the United States
Privately held companies based in Mississippi
Companies based in Jackson, Mississippi
Vicksburg, Mississippi
American companies established in 1954
Energy companies established in 1954
1954 establishments in Mississippi